| misc              =  
}}

The Shelter Live Tour was a collaborative concert tour by French DJ and record producer Madeon and American DJ and record producer Porter Robinson in support of their single "Shelter". The tour visited North America, Europe, Asia and Australia from 29 September 2016 to 23 April 2017.

Background 
On 11 August 2016, along with the release of "Shelter", Madeon and Porter Robinson announced that they would be doing a back-to-back live show, featuring them performing live together.

On 12 September 2016, the duo announced new dates for the tour.

On 15 September 2016, due to the overwhelming demand, the duo announced they would be adding two more shows in New York City and Philadelphia. The next day, they announced that tickets for all shows were on sale, and also announced the opening acts: San Holo, Danger, Fakear and Robotaki.

The tour featured a 75-minute set combining music from both Porter Robinson and Madeon into one enormous tapestry centered around a three-track core of "Language", "Technicolor", and "Shelter". The set opened with a stripped-down bit of "Language" as the intro for "Shelter" and closed with an encore that mirrors the pattern via an acoustic "Shelter" transitioning into "Language" (with samples from "Imperium"). The main melodies from each song were featured throughout the show.

Setlist 

 "Shelter" 
 "Pay No Mind" / "Easy" 
 "Sad Machine" / "You're On" 
 "You're On"
 "OK" / "Lionhearted" 
 "Flicker" 
 "Finale" / "Cut the Kid"
 "ID" 
 "Imperium" 
 "Pop Culture" 
 "Technicolor" / "Divinity" / "Innocence"
 "La Lune" / "Sea of Voices" / "Natural Light" (2016 edit)
 "Fresh Static Snow"
 "Home" 
 "Beings"
 "Pixel Empire"
 "Fellow Feeling" / "Icarus" 
 "Goodbye to a World" 
 "Shelter" (acoustic version) / "Language"  (Encore)

Tour dates 
Sources:

Notes

References 

2016 concert tours